Ernest Hunt (1877 – 1967) was a South African philatelist who was added to the Roll of Distinguished Philatelists in 1959.

References

Signatories to the Roll of Distinguished Philatelists
1877 births
1967 deaths
South African philatelists